Boo Blasters on Boo Hill is an interactive family dark ride designed and manufactured by Sally Corporation. The ride is located at four Cedar Fair amusement parks — Canada's Wonderland, Carowinds, Kings Dominion, and Kings Island.  The ride was previously themed to Hanna-Barbera's Scooby-Doo, but Cedar Fair rebranded the rides shortly after purchasing the parks from Paramount. Each ride's new theme debuted in 2010 at all four parks.

History
In 2006, Cedar Fair purchased Paramount Parks from CBS. Several of the parks attained in the purchase – Canada's Wonderland, Carowinds, Kings Dominion, and Kings Island – had a dark ride from Sally Corporation themed to the company's Scooby-Doo's Haunted Mansion attraction model. During the 2009-2010 off-season, Cedar Fair began the process of removing Nickelodeon and Hanna-Barbera themes from their recently acquired amusement parks. For the Haunted Mansion rides, Sally Corporation was contracted to remove the Scooby-Doo theme and replace it with a new one. The new theme was called Boo Blasters on Boo Hill, which debuted at all four parks for the 2010 season.

Ride experience
Boo Blasters on Boo Hill is a dark ride with individual ride vehicles on a track at Canada's Wonderland, Carowinds, and Kings Dominion, and a continuous Omnimover-style ride system at Kings Island. Guests use mounted laser guns to fire at lighted targets throughout the ride. Hitting a target enables additional animation, sounds, and special effects, as well as earns each rider points that are tallied and displayed inside the vehicle. The ride layout and special effects varies at each park location. Initially, each park sold disposable ChromaDepth 3-D glasses at the ride's entrance to enhance the blacklight paint effects throughout the ride.

Kings Island
Guests enter the attraction through the front gates of an old Gothic castle. The queue takes guests through the foyer into the first room, which features large chandeliers, cob webs, and a haunting music track playing in the background. Before boarding the ride, guests walk through a corridor with boarded-up windows on both sides. Once in the vehicle, riders travel through a haunted cemetery and mansion, filled with skeletons and ghosts. The final encounter is with Boocifer, the primary antagonist. The ride ends with a display that shows riders how well their score ranks before exiting the vehicle.

Although Kings Island's version of Boo Blasters was previously Scooby-Doo and the Haunted Castle, the ride system was originally used for Phantom Theater. Phantom Theater maintained the same ride system as its successors, but featured 55 ride vehicles and no interactive elements. The attraction ceased operation in 2002 and became transformed into Scooby-Doo and the Haunted Castle for the 2003 season.

References

External links
Boo Blasters on Boo Hill at Canada's Wonderland
Boo Blasters on Boo Hill at Carowinds
Boo Blasters on Boo Hill at Kings Dominion
Boo Blasters on Boo Hill at Kings Island

Scooby-Doo in amusement parks
Amusement rides introduced in 2010
Animatronic attractions
Amusement rides manufactured by Sally Corporation
Cedar Fair attractions
Dark rides
Sally Corporation animatronics